Lao Skyway, formerly known as Lao Air, is a private airline with its headquarters at Wattay Airport in Vientiane, Laos. It operates scheduled and charter services to airports in Laos.

History 
Lao Air was established on 24 January 2002, as a helicopter charter service company. On 8 December 2003, the airline signed a lease-to-purchase agreement with Lane Xang Minerals Limited Company for the lease of a Cessna Grand Caravan to use on its charter services. The agreement signaled the start of its fixed-wing operation. On 7 October 2005, a second leased Cessna Grand Caravan was added to its fleet.

On 14 April 2007, its regular scheduled services began using the Cessna Grand Caravan.

In April 2014 the company utilized larger passenger aircraft in order to serve the domestic airline market.

Destinations 
Lao Skyway operates scheduled flights to the following destinations in Laos, as of March 2017:

 Luang Namtha Louang Namtha Airport
 Luang Prabang Luang Prabang International Airport
 Muang Xay Oudomsay Airport
 Pakse Pakse International Airport
 Phongsaly Boun Neua Airport
 Xam Neua Nathong Airport
 Xiang Khouang Xieng Khouang Airport
 Vientiane Wattay International Airport (Base)

Fleet 
As of August 2017, Lao Skyway operates the following aircraft:

Accidents
 April 11, 2009 - Lao Air Flight 200, a Cessna 208B Grand Caravan, engine failure emergency landing in field.
 April 17, 2013 - Lao Air Flight 201, a de Havilland Canada DHC-6 Twin Otter 300, crashed after takeoff due to hitting trees.
 November 13, 2015, Lao Skyway Flight 265, a Xian MA-60 flight from Luang Prabang to Vientiane engine failure, had a runway excursion on landing.
 April 26, 2016, Eurocopter AS 350 Ecureuil, engine failure emergency landing.

References

External links

 

Airlines of Laos
Airlines established in 2002
Laotian companies established in 2002